American Samurai is a martial-arts action film directed by Sam Firstenberg and starring David Bradley and Mark Dacascos and produced by Cannon Films. Filmed in Turkey, it was released in the United States in 1992.

Premise
After a plane crash in the Japanese mountains, its only survivor—a baby named Andrew Collins—is adopted by Tatsuya Sanga, a samurai master. Andrew, along with the samurai's son, Kenjiro, are trained in the warrior’s way. Andrew excels in his training and soon surpasses his stepbrother’s skills. Kenjiro's jealousy pushes him to join the Yakuza, where he takes the Yakuza oath and forsakes the moral values of the samurai’s code. He leaves his father’s home, swearing to one day take revenge on his brother.
Ten years later, Andrew works in L.A. as a journalist. He and a female photographer track down an opium-smuggling operation in Turkey. Soon, the drug dealers kidnapped the girl, forcing Andrew to enter a deadly weapons based martial-arts tournament ruled by illegal gamblers whose greatest champion is the lethal Kenjiro.

Cast
 David Bradley as Andrew "Drew" Collins
Mariano Edelman as Drew Collins As Teenager
Euthymios Logothetis as Drew Collins As Baby
 Mark Dacascos as Kenjiro Sanga
Tal Akioshi Kitaoka as Kenjiro Sanga As Teenager
 Valarie Trapp as Janet Ward
 Rex Ryon as Ed Harrison
 Melissa Hellman as Samantha
 John Fujioka as Tatsuya Sanga
 Douvi Cohen as Stephano
 Rocky McDonald as Conan
 Ron Vreeken as McKinney
 Dion Lam as Hsing Yi / Lee
 Antony Szeto as Phan-Xu
 Melnik Dubroviko as Contestant
 Kevin Villis as Contestant
 Avi Mamn as Contestant
 Vladimir Markov as Contestant
 Mark Warren as Turk In Disco / Lars
 Koby Azarly as Turk In Disco
 Shalom Avitan as Turk In Disco
 Baruch Berkin as Hotel Clerk
 Arie Moscuna as Announcer
 Michael Morim as Police Chief
 Misha Gal as Body Guard
 John Slater as Body Guard
 Sigalit Shiry as Belly Dancer

Home media and alternate versions 
The DVD is available in Region 1. However, it is based on the edited R-rated cut. This version has subtitles added to the days of the tournament (i.e. "Day 2", "Day 3", etc.) Additionally, many scenes of violence or injury are zoomed in on, poorly cropped, or deleted altogether to avoid explicit details. The unrated cut has different dialogue in some scenes, no subtitles, and all of the violence is onscreen and considerably more graphic. This version is not available in the United States but can be found in other regions. There is an uncut Belgian bootleg DVD and the British version has approximately one second of footage cut.

See also
 List of American films of 1992
 List of martial arts films

References

External links

See also
 American Ninja (film series) from Cannon Films

1992 films
1992 martial arts films
American action films
American martial arts films
1990s English-language films
Fictional samurai
Films directed by Sam Firstenberg
Films set in Japan
Golan-Globus films
Yakuza films
Japan in non-Japanese culture
1990s American films